Nassau Street is a street in central Dublin, running along the south side of Trinity College. It goes from Grafton Street in the west to the junction of South Leinster Street and Kildare Street in the east.

History and naming

Formerly known as St Patrick's Well Lane after a 12th-century well, it was renamed in the 18th century, after the accession to the throne of King William III, a member of the House of Orange-Nassau. To emphasise the point, one of the houses erected a marble bust of William with the couplet:

The site of the well is in the grounds of Trinity College, near the Nassau Street exit. Folklore connects the well with Saint Patrick, who (legend states) struck the ground with his staff and brought forth water bubbling to the surface. The well can still be visited by arrangement with the Provost's Office of Trinity College.

Two separate visits to the street by United States President Bill Clinton have made headlines. In December 2000, the outgoing US First Family visited the Blarney Woollen Mills store. In March 2017, ex-President Clinton made an unannounced stop to the Kilkenny Store.

Redevelopment
From the 1960s onwards many of the Georgian and Victorian buildings on the street were demolished in favour of modern retail and office units. One such development was on the corner of Nassau Street and Dawson Street by the Norwich Union Group. A collection of 15 Georgian and Victorian buildings were demolished, including the original Elverys Sports corner store and the 1870 McCurdy's Law Club. The new 5-storey t-shaped office block with street level retail units was designed by Lardner and Partners. The new building, completed in 1967 was called Nassau House. Permission was granted to demolish this block in 2016, and the construction of a replacement mixed-use development is due for completion in 2022. In the 1970s, a 2.5 acre site facing onto the street was redeveloped as the Setanta Centre.

Popular culture

Nassau Street is famous for being the location in which Irish writer James Joyce met his lifelong love, Nora Barnacle, on 10 June 1904.

See also

List of streets and squares in Dublin

References

Sources

 

Streets in Dublin (city)
Shopping districts and streets in Ireland